Aleksandra Klepaczka (born 1 January 2000) is a Polish beauty pageant titleholder who won Miss Polski 2022. Klepaczka represented Poland at Miss Universe 2022 and will represent it again at Miss Supranational 2023.

Pageantry

Miss Polski 2022 
She competed at Miss Polski 2022 on July 17, 2022, at Nowy Sącz representing Łódź. She was crowned by the outgoing titleholder, Agata Wdowiak.

Miss Universe 2022 
Klepaczka represented Poland at the 71st Miss Universe competition, held at the New Orleans Morial Convention Center in New Orleans, Louisiana in the United States on January 14, 2023. During the national costume competition, she wore a red and white dress with poppy embellishments complete with a poppy-shaped hat and the Polish flag. She was not placed in the Top 16.

Miss Supranational 2023 
Klepaczka will also represent Poland at the upcoming Miss Supranational 2023.

References 

Miss Polski

2000 births
Living people
Miss Universe 2022 contestants